Ruslan Shakhbazov (born 1 May 1996) is a Russian judoka.

He is the silver medallist of the 2019 Judo Grand Slam Baku in the +100 kg category.

References

External links
 
 

1996 births
Living people
Russian male judoka
21st-century Russian people